Do Zia (also Romanized as Do Zīā and Dow Zīā; also known as Dowzpā) is a village in Hastijan Rural District, in the Central District of Delijan County, Markazi Province, Iran. At the 2006 census, its population was 20, in 7 families.

References 

Populated places in Delijan County